Ivankovo is a rural locality (a village) in Nifantovskoye Rural Settlement, Sheksninsky District, Vologda Oblast, Russia. The population was 14 as of 2002. There are 2 streets.

Geography 
Ivankovo is located 13 km northwest of Sheksna (the district's administrative centre) by road. Syamichi is the nearest rural locality.

References 

Rural localities in Sheksninsky District